Isovaleramide is an organic compound with the formula (CH3)2CHCH2C(O)NH2. The amide derived from isovaleric acid, it is a colourless solid.

Occurrence and biological activity
Isovaleramide is a constituent of valerian root.

In humans, it acts as a mild anxiolytic at lower doses and as a mild sedative at higher dosages. Isovaleramide has been shown to be non-cytotoxic and does not act as a CNS stimulant.  It inhibits the liver alcohol dehydrogenases and has a reported  of greater than 400 mg/kg when administered intraperitoneally in mice.

It is a positive allosteric modulator of the GABAA receptor, similarly to isovaleric acid.

References

Carboxamides
Anticonvulsants
Anxiolytics
Hemiterpenes
GABA analogues
GABAA receptor positive allosteric modulators
Sedatives